Patricia Powell (born 1966) is a Jamaican writer, who has won awards for her novels.

Biography
Born in Jamaica, she moved to the United States in her late teens. She received her bachelor's degree at Wellesley College, and an MFA in creative writing from Brown University, where she studied with Michael Ondaatje, among others.

She began her teaching career in 1991 in the English Department at the University of Massachusetts Boston. In 2001, Powell was the Briggs-Copeland Lecturer in Fiction at Harvard University. In 2003, she was announced as the Martin Luther King Jr. Visiting Professor of Creative Writing at MIT. Since 2009, she has been on the English faculty at Mills College.

Most of her work is not autobiographical, but explores personal themes of rejection, displacement, and healing through the lives of highly varied characters, ranging from a gay Jamaican man dying of AIDS, to a cross-dressing Chinese woman immigrant to Jamaica, to Nanny, a heroine of Jamaican independence.

Literary awards
 Pen New England Discovery Award
 Bruce Rossley Literary Award
 Ferro-Grumley Award for fiction
 Lila Wallace Reader's Digest Writers Award
 YWCA Tribute to Outstanding Women Award

Novels 
Me Dying Trial (1993) 
The Pagoda: A Novel (1998) 
A Small Gathering of Bones (2003)  
The Fullness of Everything (2009)

References 

20th-century Jamaican novelists
Jamaican emigrants to the United States
Wellesley College alumni
Brown University alumni
Harvard University staff
20th-century American novelists
21st-century American novelists
American women novelists
Living people
1966 births
Jamaican women novelists
Mills College faculty
20th-century American women writers
21st-century American women writers
21st-century Jamaican novelists
American women academics